Haarlemmerliede en Spaarnwoude is a former municipality in the Netherlands, located in the province of North Holland. It had a population of 5,760 in August 2017. On 1 January 2019, it merged with the municipality of Haarlemmermeer.

The municipality was bordered by Zaanstad to the north, Amsterdam to the east, Haarlemmermeer to the south, Haarlem to the west and Velsen to the northwest.

Population centres 
The municipality of Haarlemmerliede en Spaarnwoude consisted of the following towns and villages: Haarlemmerliede, Halfweg, Penningsveer, Spaarndam (partly), Spaarnwoude, Vinkebrug.

Topography

Dutch topographic map of the municipality of Haarlemmerliede en Spaarnwoude, June 2015

History
The municipality was formed on 8 September 1857, through the merger of the former municipalities of Haarlemmerliede and Spaarnwoude.

On 22 September 1863, Houtrijk en Polanen and Zuidschalkwijk were added to the municipality, of which Zuidschalkwijk was subsequently annexed by the city of Haarlem.

During the construction of the North Sea Canal (completed 1867), large portions of the IJ Bay were enclosed with dikes and made into polders, thereby enlarging the area of the municipality significantly. On the other hand, Haarlemmerliede en Spaarnwoude lost large areas to the cities of Haarlem and Amsterdam in 1927, 1963, and 1970.

On 1 January 2019, the municipality of Haarlemmerliede en Spaarnwoude was abolished and merged with the municipality of Haarlemmermeer.

Local government 
The municipal council of Haarlemmerliede en Spaarnwoude consisted of 11 seats, which in the last configuration were divided as follows:

 CDA – 4 seats
 VVD – 3 seats
 D66 – 2 seats
 PvdA – 2 seats

Twinning
Haarlemmerliede en Spaarnwoude is twinned with Saxilby in Lincolnshire, UK.

References

External links

Haarlemmermeer
Former municipalities of North Holland
Municipalities of the Netherlands disestablished in 2019